Peter Zoïs (born 21 April 1978) is a retired Australian footballer and manager Victorian Premier League side Oakleigh Cannons.

Career
Zois represented all of the Victorian State teams at junior level before receiving a scholarship at the Victorian Institute of Sport playing in the former National Youth League. Before making his move overseas he played a season with South Melbourne in the former National Soccer League. He also spent a short spell at Cardiff City, being brought in on a trial period due to an injury to Jon Hallworth. His only match for the Bluebirds came against Rotherham United which ended in a 2–2 draw, but an erratic performance led then manager Frank Burrows to cancel his trial spell the next day.

He moved to the Netherlands, joining NAC Breda in 1999–2000, which gained promotion to the Eredivisie after one season in the Dutch second division. During his time at NAC Breda he was part of the team that qualified for the Intertoto Cup and UEFA Cup. He then signed with Willem II in 2003 where he was also part of the team that played in the Intertoto and later beat Ajax in the semi final of the KNVB Cup reaching the final only to lose to PSV Eindhoven. The following year Willem II played in the UEFA Cup.

Zois, has represented Australia at all youth levels and holds an EU (Greek) passport. Zois spent the 2009 and 2010 seasons in the Victorian Premier League.

Zois has taken on the role of Goalkeeping coach and player for the Melbourne Heart team in its first season. Due to a lack of goalkeeping talent Zois was also made back-up keeper for the club, appearing on the bench at each of their 30 matches for the home and away season.

During the A-League off season Zois decided to join VPL side, Oakleigh Cannons FC for the 2011 campaign.

Coaching career
For the 2011–12 Melbourne Heart season, Zois will be the goalkeeping coach as well as again assuming the role of back-up keeper to Clint Bolton, after the club again failed to find a suitable person for the role.

In 2012 Peter Zois toke over Oakleigh Cannons after the surprise resignation Huss Skenderovic Oakleigh won their first game under Zois against Bentleigh Greens 2–1

Under Zois Oakleigh went on an unbelievable run to the Grand Final however lost 2–1

Honours

Club
League

NAC Breda Eerste Divisie : 1999–2000

Victorian Premier League Runners's Up 2011

Cup

Willem II: 2004–05 KNVB Cup : Runners up

Victorian Premier League Grand Final Runners's Up 2011

Coach
League

Oakleigh Cannons Victorian Premier League Runners's Up 2012

Cup

Oakleigh Cannons Victorian Premier League Grand Final Runners's Up 2012

Individual

2010 Victorian Premier League Goalkeeper Of The Year

References

External links

1978 births
Living people
Australian people of Greek descent
Soccer players from Melbourne
Australian expatriate soccer players
Thurrock F.C. players
Cardiff City F.C. players
NAC Breda players
Willem II (football club) players
Melbourne City FC players
Eredivisie players
English Football League players
A-League Men players
Melbourne City FC non-playing staff
Association football goalkeepers
Australian soccer players
Australian expatriate sportspeople in Wales
Expatriate footballers in Wales
Australian expatriate sportspeople in England
Expatriate footballers in England
Australian expatriate sportspeople in the Netherlands
Expatriate footballers in the Netherlands
Victorian Institute of Sport alumni
Association football goalkeeping coaches
Australia under-20 international soccer players
Australia under-23 international soccer players